Julie Okah-Donli (born 30 December 1966) is a Nigerian lawyer, chartered secretary and administrator, who served as the Director General of the National Agency for the Prohibition of Trafficking in Persons (NAPTIP), an agency established by the Federal Government of Nigeria in 2003 to tackle human trafficking and other related matters. She is the founder of the Julie Donli Kidney Foundation, an NGO that supports people with kidney disease  and also mother of the musician, Lady Donli.

Early life and education
Julie Okah-Donli was born on 30 December 1966 to the family of Navy Commander. and Mrs. Okah; she comes from Bayelsa State, Nigeria. She is the author of Parenting in the 21st Century, Murky Waters and Ending Human Trafficking in Nigeria

She obtained a Diploma in Law and a Degree in Law from the Ahmadu Bello University, Zaria, and was called to the bar in 1992. She won the Deans Award of Moot Court Competition.

Career
From 1996 to 2002, Okah-Donli  worked at Anthony Igbene & Co. S. O Ajayi as an Associate. She  worked as executive assistant to Chief Timipre Sylva, former governor of Bayelsa State. She had also worked with the Securities and Exchange Commission (SEC), and also a one-time head of UBA Trustees.  Okah-Donli established a Legal Firm: Julie Okah & Co (Legal Practitioners) which she was the principal partner. She later founded the Julie Donli Kidney Foundation.

On April 13, 2017, she was appointed by President Muhammadu Buhari to become the Director-General of NAPTIP. She has been leading the federal agency to tackle human trafficking, including organ trafficking and ritual killing.

Okah-Donli has advocated for more funding to tackle human trafficking and in inter-agency collaboration. Under her leadership as DG of NAPTIP, a Whistle Blowing Policy for Human Trafficking was formed.

References 

1966 births
Living people
Ahmadu Bello University alumni
Nigerian women lawyers
Social entrepreneurs
20th-century Nigerian lawyers
21st-century Nigerian lawyers